Valeriu A. Moldovan (August 5, 1875—July 19, 1954) was an Austro-Hungarian-born Romanian lawyer and politician.

A native of Câmpeni in Transylvania's Alba County, his parents were the lawyer Anania Moldovan and Ludovica (née Stwertecky); the family was Romanian Orthodox. He attended primary school in Turda, followed by gymnasium in Brașov and Blaj and the Lutheran high school in Sibiu. His last years of high school were spent in Brașov, and he graduated there in 1894. With an Emanoil Gojdu scholarship, he was able to study law at Budapest University and then at Franz Joseph University in Cluj (Kolozsvár). Moldovan graduated from the latter institution, which accorded him the title of doctor. He moved to Turda in 1903, opening a law office. From 1911 to 1914, he was deeply involved in newspaper writing. In 1910, he was elected as one of 25 members belonging to the executive committee of the Romanian National Party (PNR). He fought in World War I.

A prominent advocate of the union of Transylvania with Romania, he became secretary of the province's Directing Council once this took place in 1918. He taught at the revamped Cluj University's law faculty, offering courses on canon law starting in 1928 and being assigned a professorate in the field in 1930. In 1933, he began teaching Romanian law, and followed up with administrative law in 1934. After the PNR merged with the Peasants' Party, he joined the National Peasants' Party (PNȚ). Between 1928 and 1930, when the party was in government, he was a state secretary at the Education and Religious Affairs Ministry. In addition, he served in Parliament, first as a Deputy and then as a Senator, initially for the PNR and then for the PNȚ. He was awarded the rank of Commander in the Order of the Star of Romania.

Arrested in May 1950 by the early communist regime, he was sent to Sighet prison, where he was repeatedly beaten. He died four years later while still incarcerated.

Notes

1875 births
1954 deaths
People from Câmpeni
Members of the Romanian Orthodox Church
Babeș-Bolyai University alumni
Academic staff of Babeș-Bolyai University
20th-century Romanian lawyers
Austro-Hungarian military personnel of World War I
Ethnic Romanian politicians in Transylvania
National Peasants' Party politicians
20th-century Romanian politicians
Members of the Chamber of Deputies (Romania)
Members of the Senate of Romania
Commanders of the Order of the Star of Romania
Inmates of Sighet prison
Romanian people who died in prison custody